Diego and I (Spanish: Diego y yo) is a 1949 oil painting by the Mexican artist Frida Kahlo (1907-1954).

In November 2021, it sold at auction in Sotheby's New York for US$34.9 million, a record for a Kahlo work, and for a work by a Latin American artist. It shattered the record previously held by the painting The Rivals (1931) by her husband Diego Rivera (1886-1957) who appears on her forehead in this work. 

It is the last fully realized "bust" self-portrait Kahlo completed before her death in 1954.

The purchaser was Eduardo Costantini, the founder of MALBA, the Museum of Latin American Art of Buenos Aires, who bought it for his private collection. The painting had previously sold at Sotheby's in 1990 for $1.4 million.

See also
 List of paintings by Frida Kahlo

References

1949 paintings
Self-portraits
Paintings by Frida Kahlo
20th-century portraits
Portraits of women